Diodora fargoi is a species of sea snail, a marine gastropod mollusk in the family Fissurellidae, the keyhole limpets and slit limpets.

Description
The size of the shell reaches 9 mm.

Distribution
This species occurs in the Caribbean Sea off Panama.

References

External links
 To Biodiversity Heritage Library (1 publication)
 To Encyclopedia of Life
 To World Register of Marine Species

Fissurellidae
Gastropods described in 1958